Abbas al-Musawi (26 October 1952 – 16 February 1992) was an influential Lebanese Shia cleric, co-founder and Secretary General of Hezbollah. He was killed by the Israel Defense Forces in 1992.

Early life and education 
Al-Musawi was born into a Shia family in the village of Al-Nabi Shayth in the Beqaa Valley in Lebanon in around 1952. He spent eight years studying theology in a religious school in Najaf, Iraq, where he was deeply influenced by the views of Iranian Ruhollah Khomeini. Al-Musawi was a student, at the hawza in Najaf, of Grand Ayatollah Sayyid Mohammad Baqir al-Sadr, an influential Shi'a cleric, philosopher, political leader, and founder of the Da'wa Party of Iraq.

Activities 
Al-Musawi returned to Lebanon in 1978. Along with Subhi al-Tufayli he spearheaded the formation of Hezbollah movement in the Beqaa Valley in 1982, one of the three major areas of Shia population in Lebanon. From 1983 to 1985 he was reported to have served as operational head of the Hezbollah Special Security Apparatus. From late 1985 until April 1988 he was head of Hezbollah's military wing, the Islamic Resistance.

According to some reports (while others attribute the act to Subhi al-Tufayli), al-Musawi was responsible for the abduction of Lt. Col William Higgins while commander of Hezbollah's Islamic Resistance (military wing).

In 1991, Hezbollah had entered a new era with the end of both the Iran–Iraq War and Lebanese Civil War as well as the Taif Agreement and the release of the Kuwait 17 bombers. A new leader was thought to be needed to facilitate the release of the Western hostages held by Hezbollah and, more importantly, to shift Hezbollah's focus to resistance activity against Israel.

Al-Musawi also promised to "intensify [Hezbollah] military, political and popular action in order to undermine the peace-talks." He did not support entering mainstream politics. Unlike other Hezbollah figures, he advocated the acceptance of Taif Agreement, which was the rejection of a theocratic state in Lebanon.

Assassination 

On 16 February 1992, Israeli Apache helicopters fired missiles at the 3 vehicle motorcade of al-Musawi in southern Lebanon, killing al-Musawi, his wife, his five-year-old son, and four others. Israel said the attack had been planned as an assassination attempt in retaliation for the kidnapping and death of missing Israeli servicemen in 1986 and the abduction of US Marine and UN peace-keeping officer William R. Higgins in 1988.

In retaliation, the Islamic Jihad Organization attacked the Israeli Embassy in Buenos Aires. After the attack, the Islamic Jihad Organization declared that it was carried out as revenge for the martyr infant Hussein, al-Musawi's five-year-old son, who had been killed with his father. Later it was revealed by Dieter Bednarz and Ronen Bergman that the original plan of Israel had been just to abduct al Musawi to ensure the release of Israeli prisoners. However, Ehud Barak, then Israeli chief of staff, convinced then Israeli Prime Minister Shamir to order his assassination.

On 7 February 1994 four Israeli soldiers were killed and three wounded in an ambush in southern Lebanon which Hizbollah announced was to mark the anniversary of al-Musawi’s death. There were no Hizbollah casualties in the attack.

Al-Musawi was succeeded as Secretary General of Hezbollah by Sayyed Hassan Nasrallah.

References

External links

1952 births
1992 deaths
Aerial operations and battles involving Israel
Al-Moussawi family
Assassinated Lebanese politicians
Hezbollah founders
Lebanese Islamists
Lebanese Shia clerics
People murdered in Lebanon
Secretaries-general of Hezbollah
South Lebanon conflict (1985–2000)
Twelvers
Islamic Dawa Party politicians